Moonbeam may refer to:

 Moonlight, the light that reaches Earth from the Moon
 Moonbeam (band), a trance music group from Russia
 Moonbeam, Ontario, a township in Canada
 Moonbeam, a nickname of the American politician Jerry Brown (born 1938)
 Moonbeams, a children's cancer charity
 Moon Beams, jazz album by Bill Evans
 "Moonbeam", a song from Men Without Hats' album Pop Goes the World
 Moonbeam, a cultivar of the flowering plant Coreopsis verticillata
 Moonbeam, series of five aeroplanes built by Powel Crosley, Jr.
 Moonbeam II, a plane flown by aviation pioneer Edwin Moon in 1910
 Moonbeam III or Moonbeam IV, yachts designed by William Fife

See also
 Beam (disambiguation)
 Moon (disambiguation)
 Moonlight (disambiguation)
 Moonray (disambiguation)
 Moonshine (disambiguation)